"Hold On to Me" is a song by Australian blues and rock band The Black Sorrows. It was released as the first single from their fifth studio album Hold On to Me. It peaked at number 41 in October 1988.

The song was covered by John Denver in his 1991 Different Directions album.

Track listing
7" single (CBS )
 "Hold On to Me" – 3:51	
 "Safe in the Arms of Love" – 3:01

Charts

References

1988 singles
CBS Records singles
Songs written by Joe Camilleri
Song recordings produced by Joe Camilleri
The Black Sorrows songs
1988 songs